May Hill is an unincorporated community in Adams County, in the U.S. state of Ohio.

History
May Hill had its start when a country store opened there. A post office called May Hill was established in 1856, and remained in operation until 1905.

References

Unincorporated communities in Adams County, Ohio
1856 establishments in Ohio
Populated places established in 1856
Unincorporated communities in Ohio